Archbishop Job (Osacky) of Chicago (March 18, 1946 – December 18, 2009) was the archbishop of the Orthodox Church in America's Diocese of the Midwest until his unexpected death. His territory included Illinois, Indiana, Iowa, Kansas, Michigan, Minnesota, Missouri, North Dakota, Nebraska, Ohio, and Wisconsin.

Archbishop Job was born Richard John Osacky in Chicago on March 18, 1946. Saints Peter and Paul Church, at 53rd Street and Western Avenue, was his home parish. He completed university studies at Northern Illinois University and, after graduating from Saint Tikhon's Orthodox Theological Seminary in 1970, he served as cantor and youth director at Saint John the Baptist Church in Black Lick, Pennsylvania. He assumed responsibilities in leading Divine Services in the prescribed manner for readers, conducting religious education and youth work, and writing icons.

In 1973, Reader John was ordained to the diaconate and consequently to the priesthood by (then) Bishop Theodosius of Pittsburgh. He was assigned to the parish in Black Lick, where he also served as spiritual director for the Orthodox Christian Fellowship at nearby Indiana University of Pennsylvania.

In 1975, he was blessed a riasaphor monk, and later was tonsured a monk in the Lesser Schema by (then) Bishop Herman in August 1982. In November of that year he was elevated to the rank of archimandrite.

The Diocese of New England nominated Job as their diocesan bishop. The Holy Synod of the Orthodox Church in America ratified the nomination and elected him Bishop of Hartford and the Diocese of New England. He was consecrated to the episcopacy on January 29, 1983, at All Saints Church in Hartford, Connecticut.

At its session of November 5, 1992, the Holy Synod of Bishops elected Bishop Job as Bishop of Chicago and Diocese of the Midwest. He was enthroned as Bishop of his native city at Holy Trinity Cathedral on February 6, 1993.

In addition to his regular duties as the ruling hierarch of the Diocese of the Midwest, Abp. Job was recognized as an accomplished icon painter and an authority in the field. At the 17 March 2004 session of the Holy Synod, Bishop Job was elevated to the rank of archbishop.

Archbishop Job died unexpectedly in the morning of December 18, 2009 in a hotel in Maumee, Ohio.

References

1946 births
2009 deaths
20th-century Eastern Orthodox archbishops
Bishops of the Orthodox Church in America
Christianity in Chicago
Religious leaders from Illinois
21st-century Eastern Orthodox archbishops
20th-century American clergy
21st-century American clergy